Ostryopsis nobilis is a shrub species in the genus Ostryopsis found in China. It is an endemic Chinese medicinal plant. It forms thickets on sunny mountain slopes between 1500 and 3000 m. It is found in South West Sichuan and North West Yunnan.

Two cyclic diarylheptanoids, named ostryopsitrienol and ostryopsitriol, can be isolated from the stems of  O. nobilis.

References

External links 
 Flora of China - Ostryopsis nobilis

Betulaceae
Flora of Sichuan
Flora of Yunnan
Plants described in 1914
Plants used in traditional Chinese medicine
Taxa named by Isaac Bayley Balfour
Taxa named by William Wright Smith